Ferdinand Martini (1 September 1870 – 23 December 1930) was a German film actor. He appeared in 38 films between 1920 and 1931. He was born in Munich and died in Germany.

Selected filmography

 The Monastery's Hunter (1920)
 Night of the Burglar (1921)
 Nathan the Wise (1922)
 The Favourite of the Queen (1922)
 Maciste and the Chinese Chest (1923)
 Helena (1924)
 The Path to God (1924)
 Two People (1924)
 Hunted Men (1924)
 Mrs Worrington's Perfume (1925)
 The Shot in the Pavilion (1925)
 Written in the Stars (1925)
 Hidden Fires (1925)
 Your Desire Is Sin (1925)
 A Song from Days of Youth (1925)
 Reluctant Imposter (1925)
 The Pleasure Garden (1925)
 The Seventh Son (1926)
 The Hunter of Fall (1926)
 The Mountain Eagle (1927)
 Restless Hearts (1928)
 Behind Monastery Walls (1928)
 The Women's War (1928)
 The Foreign Legionnaire (1928)
 The Eccentric (1929)
 When the White Lilacs Bloom Again (1929)
 The Emperor's Sweetheart (1931)

References

External links

1870 births
1930 deaths
German male film actors
German male silent film actors
Male actors from Munich
20th-century German male actors